is a Japanese manga series by Strike Tanaka, serialized in Media Factory's shōjo manga magazine Monthly Comic Gene since 2011. It has been collected into nineteen tankōbon volumes. The series is licensed in North America by Seven Seas Entertainment. An anime television adaptation began airing on July 5, 2016, and concluded on September 20, 2016, with 12 episodes.

Plot
Mahiru Shirota is a normal high school student who likes simple things. One day, on his way back home, he finds a black cat and decides to take care of it, naming it Kuro. The next day, however, he is surprised to find out that the black cat is, in fact, one of the seven vampires that represent the Seven Deadly Sins. His name is Sleepy Ash, he represents Sloth, and he turns into a cat when exposed to sunlight. By giving Sleepy Ash a name and a cat bell, and then calling him by his given name, Mahiru accidentally forms a temporary contract with him. The contract is finalized once Sleepy Ash drinks his blood, making him Mahiru's vampire servant known as "Servamp" and Mahiru becomes his master called "Eve". Following this, Mahiru and Sleepy Ash, now Kuro, encounter Tsubaki, a vampire who claims to be the Servamp of Melancholy and the unknown eighth brother of the other Servamps. Tsubaki intends to wage an all-out war against his six brothers and Sister, while Mahiru decides to gather them to fight against Tsubaki and his group together.

Characters

Eves

He's a freshman high school student who lost his mother to an accident at a young age. Having no father to take care of him, he was left in the care of his ever-busy uncle. As a result, Mahiru grew up mostly alone and has developed many talents for household chores. Mahiru's talent for housework has also extended into his school life where he often uses them for class projects and the like. After discovering Sleepy Ash as a cat and eventually becoming his Eve, he obtains a Lead (essentially a conjured tool for Eves) in the form of a Broomstick. Kuro later notes in irony that it is what may represent him the most due to Mahiru's personality, and that it was the first thing he used to hit Kuro with when they met. His Lead later changes into a Spear, giving Mahiru more physical prowess. Mahiru's catchphrase is "Thinking simply, it's got to be me!"

Lily's Eve, he's a high school student who is in the same year as Mahiru. Misono comes from a very wealthy family and unfortunately possesses a very weak physical composition, which causes him to be easily exhausted. He has a tendency to look down on others such as when he commanded Mahiru to work for him in stopping Tsubaki. It's possible that this may be due to a lack of social skills. He is a child born from the affair between his father and Mikuni's home tutor. Out of jealousy, his real mother was killed by his father's wife with Doubt Doubt's help. She spared Misono and decided to raise him as her own son. While growing up, he witnessed his older brother Mikuni kill their mother but could not remember it fully because his memory was altered by Lily. He resented his brother for leaving the house until he learns the truth. Misono's Lead is a chair which he often sits in to rest, and has so far shown creative uses for said chair in combat.

Jeje's Eve, he's Misono's older brother and an antique dealer. He puts on a childish personality, however his true personality is quite the opposite; he is cunning, shown to be quite manipulative and doesn't have a second thought killing Subclass. Misono resented him for killing their mother and for running away and taking Doubt Doubt with him. It is later revealed that Mikuni and Misono are actually half-brothers. Mikuni accepted the result of his father's affair but despised his father all the same. When Doubt Doubt's power took a toll on his mother's sanity, Mikuni killed her to keep her from killing Misono. Then he left home, taking Doubt Doubt with him. He is a former member of C3. During the battle at C3 headquarter, Mikuni is revealed to be working together with Tsubaki's group for yet unknown agenda. His Lead is a rope that takes the form of a noose, which he uses to strangle people to death. He is, so far, the only Eve to have a Lead that specialises in killing his opponents.

Old Child's Eve, he's a junior high school student who works in an onsen. He tends to be very soft-spoken and simple-minded. Despite being a junior-high student, Tetsu has a tall and big stature, and people often mistake him for a college student. Tetsu doesn't seem to care at all that he's associated with vampires, shown by how he often carries around his Lead (in his case, a giant indestructible coffin) which he even uses to advertise for his family's Onsen, since he doesn't know how to get rid of it. His contract with Hugh has recently come under speculation as it was revealed that he is not the one who chose the name "Hugh", with a necessary part of the contract being that the Eve chooses the new name; and it is possible that Hugh has been working with Tsubaki, much to the shock of Tetsu.

Lawless' Eve, he's a world-known Austrian pianist. Licht's personality can only be described as bizarre; he seems to consider himself an Angel, and even strikes poses while wearing a white backpack with wings attached. It's rare to see him smile; he almost always scowls. Licht has a violent streak, often brutally attacking other vampires (which he labels "Demons"). Licht also has an intense hatred for Lawless in particular, who he often calls a "rotten hedgehog" and is prone to tormenting or attacking. Licht possesses two Leads: A pair of powerful boots which can slow the regeneration abilities of vampires he kicks with, and a Grand Piano which he can play various songs on, with often debilitating effects on those who listen to them.

An engineer for C3 who has become the new Eve for the Servamp of Wrath, The Mother, who she named "Freya". She is a childhood friend of Shuhei whom she nicknames "Loki". She joined C3 together with him after the death of his father to make sure his vengeance won't be fulfilled as she doesn't want him to become a murderer. Unlike Shuhei, Izuna believes that humans and vampires can coexist, preferring to settle things peacefully rather than by brute force. This make her regretting ever making weapons that have been used by C3 to kill countless vampires. During her contract with The Mother, their contract item is Izuna's hair.

The current Eve of World End, the Servamp of Gluttony, who he named "Ildio". Niccolo is the boss of the Carpediem mafia family, succeeding after his father. Despite his position as the boss, Niccolo is rather spineless and lacks self-confidence, easily getting scared or pressured by people around him, but is still trying his best to live up to his position as the boss of Carpediem family. He cares for his subordinates and his Servamp, and wouldn't stand quiet if somebody hurt them. He is constantly saddened by the fact that World End seemingly never cares for him and his previous Eves whose names he never bothered to remember.

Servamps

The Servamp, or servant vampire, of Sloth. Kuro is the oldest of the eight Servamp siblings and, according to Mikuni, arguably the most powerful of them. This is contrary to Kuro's lazy personality, and he can often be found dozing off, playing video games, or eating junk food in Mahiru's apartment. So far, he is the only Servamp without any Subclass, because he doesn't know whether a person wants to live longer or not and has so decided to have none. Kuro's past is mired in mystery to Mahiru, as he is rarely ever willing to discuss it. The mere mention of his past was enough to make the usual lazy Kuro to become angered. It's revealed that Kuro had a falling out with Lawless because he decided to kill the one who made them vampires after receiving the request from C3. The reason for accepting the request is because he thinks that the world doesn't need "monsters" like them anymore. Following the request, Sleepy Ash killed his own creator, but this haunted Kuro who ended up regretting his action. The regret and grief made Kuro decide to not do anything unless someone tells him to, until Mahiru urges him to face his own mistake, which also significantly improves Kuro and Mahiru's friendship. Kuro has two animal forms: the first being his usual cat form, and the second being a giant lion form. Kuro's primary weapons are a pair of deadly, razor-sharp claws that can easily skewer targets.

The vampire of Melancholy. This mysterious man introduces himself as the eighth Servamp and the youngest sibling, despite the fact that there are only supposed to be seven. Tsubaki has a psychotic and unstable personality, which is evident through his stated desire to "kill everyone who doesn't know him". His motives and past are currently unclear, but he has a close relation with the person who created Servamps, referring I'm as "Teacher". However, Tsubaki genuinely cares for each of his Subclasses and won't ever betray them. Tsubaki commanded a sizable force of Subclass vampires until Lawless of Greed massacred almost all of them during their attempt to kill his Eve during a concert. His animal form is a fox. His primary weapon is a Katana.

, also known as the Servamp of Lust, is the Servamp of Misono Alicein. The name given to him for his contract is Snow Lily or simply Lily. He is the second youngest of the eight known Servamps, and has a tendency to strip no matter the occasion. For generations he has served the Misono family alongside Doubt Doubt, the Servamp of Envy. After Mikuni killed his mother to protect Misono seven years before, Lily manipulated Misono's memory so he won't remember the reason behind Mikuni's banishment from the house out of fear that Misono would reject him for being the representation of lust. When Misono finds out about Lily's manipulation without knowing the truth, the bond between him and Misono becomes strained for a moment, giving Otogiri the opportunity to destroy his pocket watch that was also the source of his power, greatly weakening him. Since then, Lily is mostly bedridden and lost his tendency to strip as his body becomes weaker until he reverts into a baby. His animal form is a butterfly. His primary weapon is a conjured Scythe that can cut the "spirits" of its victims, rendering them unconscious.

The Servamp of Envy, and bound by contract under the name  to Mikuni Alicein. Jeje is the third eldest Servamp, and possesses a quiet personality. He rarely speaks and often mumbles when he does. He is also quite gullible, believing every time Mikuni promises to give him his blood in exchange Jeje doing as he told him to, only for Mikuni to pretend not remembering the promise. Jeje used to serve Mikuni's mother and has been protecting the Alicein family together with Lily for generations. However, seven years before the start of the story, Jeje's power started to corrupt Mikuni's mother, leading her to kill Misono's mother. Jeje erased any evidence of the murder. She eventually tried to kill Misono himself but the attempt was stopped by Mikuni who killed his mother and took Jeje with him when he left the house. His animal form is a snake. Jeje's primary weapons are a pair of conjured fully automatic guns that are mostly hidden underneath his massive sleeves.

Old Child is the Servamp of Pride and is bound by contract to Tetsu Sendagaya. This is despite his tiny stature, being no taller than 2'6". Hugh's most notable personality feature is his childish sense of pride, such as how he claims that Tetsu's blood is absolutely gourmet. Out of all the Servamps, Hugh has the most Subclass, to the point where they are practically his information network; he often uses them to gather intel on Tsubaki or indulge in his obsession with other people's love stories. During the group's attempt to rescue Licht and Lawless, Hugh fell into Tsubaki's trap and lost his power after being defeated. The result is the total change of Hugh's character, going from being childish to a personality of an old man, having walking and memory issues. However, when Hugh suddenly disappeared following C3's collapse, it's revealed that Tetsu and Hugh may have never formed a contract to begin with as Hugh was the one who came up with his own name rather than Tetsu. He was also the one who lured World End into meeting Tsubaki, causing the Servamp of Gluttony to lose his power. This reveals that the Jinn that comes out during Lawless and Licht's rescue operation, is in fact, World End's, meaning that Hugh never lose his power.

Lawless is the Servamp of Greed and the fifth youngest Servamp, bound by contract to Licht Jekylland Todoroki. Lawless' personality is extremely unstable, as he has no interest in the value of human life and is often prone to brutally slaughtering anyone in his way. According to the Servamp of Pride, Lawless has a habit of killing his Eves if he gets bored of them. Licht, however, is an exception as Lawless enjoys his naive personality and his habit of calling himself an Angel. He used to be a Servamp of a princess named Ophelia, and fell in love with her. He was heartbroken when she married a prince from a neighbouring country and was then executed, refusing to escape with Lawless because she wanted peace between both countries. Lawless' condition worsened after he had a falling out with Kuro who decided to kill their own creator himself, leading Lawless to become the way he is now. After Licht helped him realize his true wishes, Lawless abandoned his previous view on life and finally reconciled with Kuro. He lost his power after Tsubaki destroyed his contract item, physically weakening Lawless.

The Servamp of Wrath and the only female Servamp. She is always frowning, giving her an impression that she is angry, though she's only trying to act cool. She was married to her Eve and together they owned an apple farm. She was later confined in C3 Tokyo HQ along with her two Subclass, Gil and Ray, though she didn't make a move nor had any intention to escape from confinement until Licht and Lawless free her. She reveals that a week before her confinement, her Eve died of old age. Lawless requests her to help stop Tsurugi, which she agrees to and saves Tsurugi when he was drowning after getting defeated by her Subclass who were trying to free her. She and Tsurugi are then trapped in the falling floor due to the impact of the prison break. To save both herself and Tsurugi, The Mother suggests that Tsurugi become her new Eve, but Tohma shot him down. She instead ends up forming a contract with Izuna Nobel, taking the contract name .

The Servamp of Gluttony. True to the sin he embodies, he has an incredibly huge appetite, able to eat the whole restaurant menu. Unfortunately, he is broke and doesn't have much money. He proclaimed himself as Sleepy Ash's rival. World End always keeps to himself and is rather distant with every Eve he contracted with, forgetting their names once his contract with them is over. This stems from the fact that he'll never die due to his immortality while his Eves would sooner or later died.

Subclass

Mahiru's classmate and Tsubaki's Subclass. When he was a child, he lived with his older sister and their parents. Their parents were abusive and mistreated them. One night, Sakuya watched his sister jump from their apartment room, being forced by their parents so they can get her insurance money, but not before she made them promise to spare Sakuya. Unfortunately, years later, Sakuya was forced to do the same, and when he was dying, he was saved by Tsubaki. Sakuya first met Mahiru when they were in middle school, becoming friends with him and he even went as far as manipulating Mahiru's memory to make him think that they were childhood friends. After Mahiru got into a contract with Sleepy Ash, Sakuya removed the fake memories from Mahiru and attacked him, wishing for Mahiru to end his life. Mahiru, however, refused to kill him and instead promised that he will free him of Tsubaki's control.

Tsubaki's Subclass, a somewhat eccentric childish man who fights with magical playing cards and takes the form of a doll. He first appears in the first chapter, being ordered by Tsubaki to take down both Kuro and Mahiru, only to get defeated by Kuro after Mahiru finalized their contract.

He was Tsubaki's Subclass who always calls him "Young Master". When he was a human, Shamrock used to be a member of C3 and close friend of Shuhei's father. When he fought Tsubaki together with his teammates, he was left behind, making him believed that he has been abandoned by his friends. The heartbroken Shamrock is then recruited by Tsubaki as his Subclass and he killed Shuhei's father in retaliation. During the fight against Mahiru and his friends, he, Belkia, and Higan were captured and held captive by C3 until he was freed in the prison break instigated by The Mother's Subclasses. Shamrock is then confronted by Shuhei, whom he easily defeated. Before he could kill Shuhei, he is stopped and defeated by The Mother and Izuna. After his defeat, Shamrock is remorseful for killing Shuhei's father and resolves to make amends, leaving Tsubaki's group.

She is Tsubaki's female Subclass. She is mostly seen wearing a nurse outfit. She has a special ability to use her strings to bind her opponents and also control marionettes that she uses for attacks. If necessary, she also uses her strings to control her unconscious allies' bodies and moves them to attack. She has a habit of finding something that is unexpected to be troublesome.

Sometimes romanized as Lila, he is Tsubaki's Subclass who survived Lawless' massacre during the ambush at Licht's piano concert. He is saved by Mahiru from Lawless and is then used as a bargaining chip to exchange the Greed Pair when the two are captured. After Tsubaki saved him, he is allowed to live freely, separate from Tsubaki's group.

Higan is Tsubaki's strongest Subclass and is considered number 2 in Tsubaki's group. He has the ability to create fire from his hands and ignites flames from scratches he made on an opponents' body. When drinking human blood, he metamorphoses back into his much younger form that also significantly increases his power.

Nicknamed Gil, he is Lawless' Subclass who always covers his entire body by wearing Licht's blue whale mascot costume, Whale.

C3

Tsuyuki is a member of the research team in C3. He has a deep hatred for vampires after his father, who was also a C3 member, was killed by Shamrock, one of Tsubaki's Subclass. Due to this, he initially wanted to be on the fighting team, but his bad fighting style forced him to stay in Research. When he was in high school, he was Mikuni's underclassman and the two of them don't get along. He always anticipates small things that might happen and prepares in advance for when the time comes. This becomes one of the running gags in the series.

As one of the strongest C3 members from the fighting team, Tsurugi is feared amongst vampires for mercilessly killing many of their kind, and seems to enjoy the act. He was born and grew up in C3 under the guidance of C3 Tokyo branch's vice manager, Taishi Toma. While he is cruel and even sadistic in slaying his enemies, he is cheerful and childish around other people, especially around Junichiro and Yumikage who are his best friends. He claims he has no pride and will do anything as long as he gets paid. Harshly trained under Toma's brainwashing, Tsurugi's mind became very unstable. He blindly follows Toma's orders and kills whoever's in his way, be it vampires or humans, going as far as to hurt even his own close friends under the twisted impression it is for their own protection. He used to be partnered with Mikuni and Jeje during Mikuni's time in C3, but they hate each other so much that they both have no hesitation to try and kill the other.

Junichiro is one of C3 members from the fighting team who is partnered with Tsurugi and Yumikage.

Partnered with Tsurugi and Junichiro, Yumikage is one of C3's fighting division.

Toma is the vice manager of C3 Tokyo branch. He has been taking care of Tsurugi since he was a baby, saving him from his abusive family. He further manipulated Tsurugi into becoming heavily reliant on him while ignoring Tsurugi's suffering. He planned to make Tsurugi the ninth Servamp, but this was stopped by Mahiru and Kuro. After C3's collapse, Toma is presumed dead, but then make one final call to Mahiru's uncle who requests his survival to be kept a secret. It is later revealed that he is actually Mahiru's birth father. When Mahiru's mother was pregnant with Mahiru, she never told Toma, and he only learned about it after Mahiru's uncle confronted him with the revelation after her death.

Other characters

One of Mahiru's close friends since childhood.

One of Mahiru's close friends since childhood.

Mahiru's uncle who took Mahiru into his care after his mother passed away. Due to his work that requires him to work abroad, Toru rarely returns home. Mahiru looks up to his uncle and considers him his role model, taking a few of his characteristics.

Johannes is a researcher obsessed with researching vampires, taking delight in doing experiments on them. He is also an acquaintance of Mikuni's.

Lily's Subclass and Mari's twin sister.

Lily's Subclass and Yuri's twin sister.

Dodo is a servant of the Alicein household. He was an orphan who was saved and taken in by Lily when he was a child.

Crantz is Licht's manager.

Ophelia was Lawless' Eve whom Lawless fell in love with hundreds of years before the story. She was a princess of an unknown country who made a contract with Lawless when she was a child. She wished for peace in both her own and the enemy's country, so she married the other country's prince. However, the marriage was a ploy by her kingdom, leading her to be executed. Even though she could escape, she refused to do so and instead became determined to bring the two countries together by becoming the symbol of peace, conveying her wish before she got executed. As she hoped, the two countries were united and she became the symbol of peace. Unfortunately, the country was eventually destroyed by another bigger country. Her death had a strong impact on Lawless who began to think that all lives are worthless, meaningless and no one is unique.

Media

Manga
Strike Tanaka began publishing Servamp in the first issue of Media Factory's Monthly Comic Gene magazine on June 15, 2011, where it was first tentatively titled Eve and Servamps. The chapters from the magazine have been collected into nineteen tankōbon that have been released by Kadokawa. In July, 2014 Seven Seas Entertainment announced it had licensed the series for publication in North America. Seventeen adapted English-language manga volumes have been released, with more announced. In addition to print material, the series also inspired six drama CDs, the first of which was released with volume six of the manga in July 2014. The manga entered the hiatus in February 2017 due to the author's health. She had the intense pain which led to rest and recover. The manga resumed on April 15, 2017, after she was recovered from her pain.

Volume list

Music
In addition to drama CDs the series has also produced several character song CDs, as well as an original soundtrack CD. In total there have been five character pair CDs, released in 2015, as well as a character song mini-album and an original soundtrack, both of which have been released in October 2016. The anime series also had an opening song, "Deal With" by Oldcodex, and an ending song, "Sunlight Avenue" by Takuma Terashima.

Anime
An anime television adaptation was announced in the August issue of Monthly Comic Gene. It was reported by Oricon Style that the adaptation would be a television series. The anime was produced by Brain's Base and Platinum Vision with Itto Sara serving as the chief director, Hideaki Nakano as director and Kenji Konuta handling series composition, with character designs by Junko Yamanaka and music by Kenji Kawai. The anime aired from July to September 2016. Funimation had licensed the series outside Asia for streaming on their website. In Southeast Asia, Muse Communication holds the license to the series.

Episode list

Reception
On Anime News Network, Rebecca Silverman gave the first three English language adapted manga volumes a combined overall grade of B.

Notes

References

External links
 at Seven Seas Entertainment

Anime series based on manga
Brain's Base
Comedy anime and manga
Funimation
Kadokawa Dwango franchises
Media Factory manga
Muse Communication
Platinum Vision
Seven Seas Entertainment titles
Shōjo manga
Supernatural anime and manga
Vampires in anime and manga